Mesika is a Jewish-Tunisian surname and may refer to:

Erez Mesika, current Israeli midfielder with Hapoel Be'er Sheva
Gal Mesika, Israeli American footballer
Gershon Mesika, Israeli lawyer and politician
Miri Mesika, Israeli singer
Reef Mesika, Israeli footballer currently playing for Hapoel Umm al-Fahm

Jewish surnames